Bras d'Or (R-103) was a small experimental hydrofoil built for the Royal Canadian Navy (RCN) during the 1950s.

Built by Saunders-Roe from either a Saunder-Roe motor boat or Vosper PT boat hull, the Bras d'Or was built based on the prototype R-101 in service with the Royal Navy. Launched in 1957, it underwent trials off Wales in May and arrived in Canada in July. Acquired by the Royal Canadian Navy, it was never commissioned as a warship.

Baddeck retired from the Canadian Forces in 1973 and was later acquired by the Canada Science and Technology Museum in Ottawa, Ontario. Baddeck remains in storage with her three foils detached and stored separately.

Notes

References

External links
SARO Hydrofoil Bras D'Or

Hydrofoils of the Royal Canadian Navy
Museum ships in Canada
Museum ships in Ontario
Experimental ships of the Royal Canadian Navy
1957 ships
Auxiliary ships of the Royal Canadian Navy